Description of the electric power supply of the Balearic Islands.

Menorca 

It is oil fired and has a net generation capacity of 245 MW. From it 2 132 kV-lines run to Dragonera substation.

132 kV/15 kV-Substations 

Beside the connection between Mahon ( Maó) power station and Dragonera substation, there is a 132 kV-line interconnecting the following substations.

Planned 132 kV/15 kV Substations

Power cable to Mallorca 
A 132 kV-line links Ciutadella substation on Menorca with Es Bessons substation on Mallorca. It runs from Ciutadella substation overhead to Celan Bosch cable terminal at  where the submarine cable to Mallorca starts. It ends at Cala Mesquida cable terminal at Cala Mesquida , where the overhead line to Es Bessons substation starts.

Ibiza/Formentera 

On Ibiza and Formentera, there are two thermal power stations, one on Ibiza, the other on Formentera.

69 kV/15 kV substation 

The substations on Ibiza are interconnected together with Elvissa Power Station over a 69 kV-ring running from Elvissa Power Station via Torrent, Santa Eularia, Sant Antoni and Sant Jordi. Beside this, there is a connection between Torrent and San Antonio. Since 2007 a 69 kV-cable with a capacity of 50 MW connects the powergrid of Formentera with that of Ibiza. The terminals of this cable are Torrent and Formentera Power Station. From Torrent a 132 kV three phase AC link to Santa Ponsa, Mallorca is under construction (capacity 2 x 100 MV).

Planned 69 kV/15 kV-Substation

Mallorca

Power Stations 
There are four thermal power plants on Mallorca. The first two feed in the 220 kV-grid

HVDC-connection to the mainland 

An HVDC cable (±250 kV) with the name Cometa has been commissioned in August 2012. The converter substation is at Santa Ponsa . It will also contain a 220 kV/132 kV-substation, from which a 132 kV submarine cable for three-phase AC will run to Torrent on Ibiza.

220 kV/69 kV-Substations 

The backbone of power supply of Mallorca is the 220 kV grid. The following stations are in service

2 lines interconnect Valldurgent with Son Reus, Llubi with Murterar PowerStation and Llubi with Es Bessons substation. A single ring-line interconnects Llubi, Son Reus and Son Orlandis substation. New 220 kV-substations are planned/under construction at Santa Ponsa, Rafal, Latzer and Lucmajor. A three-phase 132 kV AC cable between Es Bessons and Ciutadella on Menorca is under construction.

69 kV/15 kV-Substations 
Distribution of electric power is done by 69 kV and 15 kV grids. The following 69 kV stations are in service.

Planned 69 kV/15 kV-Substations

See also 
 List of power stations in Spain
 Cometa

External links 
  http://dgener.caib.es/www/user/portalenergia/pdse/docs/memoria/Capitol4.pdf

Electric power infrastructure in Spain
Electric power in Spain
Buildings and structures in the Balearic Islands